The Timișana is a left tributary of the river Timiș in Romania. It discharges into the Timiș in Hitiaș. It flows through the southern outskirts of Lugoj and through the villages Boldur, Căpăt, Racovița and Hitiaș.

Tributaries
The following rivers are tributaries to the river Timișana (from source to mouth):

Left: Fața, Cinca, Dicșan, Cherăstău

References

Rivers of Romania
Rivers of Timiș County